Titus Sheard (October 4, 1841 in Batley, West Riding of Yorkshire, England – April 13, 1904 in Little Falls, Herkimer County, New York) was an American businessman and politician.

Life
He came to the United States in 1856, and settled first in Mottville, New York, later in Little Falls. Here he began working at a wool factory, and in 1864 became sole owner of the Eagle Knitting Mill, and in 1872 incorporated the Little Falls Knitting Mill Company.

In 1863, he married Helen M. Waite (b. 1843), and they had two daughters, Edith (b. 1865) and Martha (1868–1947).

He was a member of the New York State Assembly (Herkimer Co.) in 1878, 1879 and 1884, and was elected Speaker in 1884 after defeating Theodore Roosevelt in the Republican assemblymen's caucus.

He was a delegate to the 1884 Republican National Convention.

He was a member of the New York State Senate (23rd D.) in 1890 and 1891. He lost in his quest for renomination in the Republican State Convention at Utica, New York in October 1891 as the candidate of the Miller faction, when his adversary John E. Smith, the candidate of the Platt faction, was nominated on the 937th ballot.

Sources
 Obit in NYT on April 14, 1904
 Republican State Convention at Utica, in NYT on October 10, 1891
 Sheard ancestry

1841 births
1904 deaths
People from Batley
Speakers of the New York State Assembly
Republican Party members of the New York State Assembly
Republican Party New York (state) state senators
British emigrants to the United States
19th-century American politicians